Chavush is an alternate spelling of the Turkish title Çavuş. It may also refer to:
Avuş, Azerbaijan
Kevork Chavush